A distinctive unit insignia (DUI) is a metallic heraldic badge or device worn by soldiers in the United States Army. The DUI design is derived from the coat of arms authorized for a unit. DUIs may also be called "distinctive insignia" (DI) or, imprecisely, a "crest" or a "unit crest" by soldiers or collectors. The U.S. Army Institute of Heraldry is responsible for the design, development and authorization of all DUIs.

History

Pre-World War I Insignia 
Distinctive ornamentation of a design desired by the organization was authorized for wear on the Mess Jacket uniform by designated organizations (staff corps, departments, corps of artillery, and infantry and cavalry regiments) per War Department General Order 132 dated December 31, 1902. The distinctive ornamentation was described later as coats of arms, pins and devices. The authority continued until omitted in the Army uniform regulation dated December 26, 1911.

Distinctive unit insignia 
War Department Circular 161 dated 29 April 1920 authorized the use of a regimental coat of arms or badge as approved by the War Department for wear on the collar of the white uniform and the lapels of the mess jacket. War Department Circular 244, 1921 states: "It has been approved, in principle, that regiments of the Regular Army and National Guard may wear distinctive badges or trimmings on their uniforms as a means of promoting esprit de corps and keeping alive historical traditions. Various organizations which carry colors or standards have generally submitted coats of arms having certain historical significance. As fast as they are approved, these coats of arms will form the basis for regimental colors or standards which will eventually replace the present regimental colors or standards when these wear out. The use of these coats of arms as collar ornaments in lieu of the insignia of corps, departments, or arms of service would be an example of distinctive badge to be worn by the regiment." `The first unit to wear this insignia was the 51st Artillery which received approval for wear on March 18, 1922.  It was designed by Master Gunner and Master Sergeant Edward C. Kuhn, the artist responsible for creating all authorized coats of arms and distinctive unit insignia at the time.

Present 
Up until 1965, only regiments and separate battalions were authorized a coat of arms and distinctive units insignia. Now all major commands, field hospitals, corps, logistics commands and certain other units – groups, for example – are authorized distinctive unit insignia.

Design 
 
The unit commanding officer requests approval of a distinctive unit insignia. A check is made by the Institute of Heraldry to determine the availability of a current copy of the lineage and honor statement and/or history for the unit. If it is not available, one is requested from the United States Army Center of Military History. The unit's history is reviewed to determine if the unit may inherit a previously approved distinctive unit insignia or if a new design should be made.

If a new design is to be made, careful study is made of the history and battle honors of the unit. The most important decorations, honors, combat service and missions are represented in the design of the insignia. Sometimes two centuries of history are condensed into symbolism for one distinctive unit insignia. A proposed design is created and sent to the commanding officer for review and concurrence. Upon concurrence by the unit commander an official letter of approval of the distinctive unit insignia is sent to the unit.

Manufacturing drawings and specifications are sent to a certified manufacturer which provides samples of the finished distinctive unit insignia to the Institute of Heraldry for approval. Once approved the manufacturer may produce this insignia. Each manufacturer has an identifying hallmark assigned by the Institute of Heraldry which is applied to the back of the insignia.

The shield shape design is used to identify color bearing organizations (for example, regiments and battalions). Other design patterns will be used for non-color bearing units. The design is based on war service, assignment or accomplishments. Cartoon characters or logos are not authorized as design elements. Symbols are to represent mission rather than actual equipment as equipment becomes out-of-date. Unit designations, numerals, letters, geographical outlines, reproductions of other insignia will not be included as part of the design.

Once a distinctive unit insignia is approved, it is changed only when a heraldic or historical error is found. A modification of unit designation or mission does not permit a change to the DUI design. As a result, DUIs tend to further reflect the historic roots of a unit. For example, many older Military Intelligence battalions' DUIs feature teal blue rather than oriental blue, having been designed for Army Security Agency units which were designated as branch-immaterial. Likewise, those that began as Signals units typically feature orange. The 211th Military Police Battalion provides an example of a unit changing branches without changing insignia, having been assigned to six different branches during its existence.  Color-bearing battalions and regiments continue to have insignia without the shield shape if they were formerly non-color-bearing units when the insignia was approved; this includes not only former groups and brigades that were downsized, but as well flexible battalions (i.e., battalions composed of variable attached numbered companies, rather than fixed-TOE battalions composed of lettered companies which are organic to the battalion) which gained coats of arms and thus colors in the late 1990s, long after their DUIs were already approved.

Authorization 
Distinctive unit insignia (DUI) of a design approved by The Institute of Heraldry, U.S. Army, are authorized under Paragraph 28-22 of Army Regulation 670–1.

Wear 

The distinctive unit insignia of the unit to which the soldier is assigned are worn as follows:
On the beret flash of enlisted personnel
On the breast patch of the black pullover sweater
On the shoulder loops of the enlisted personnel's Army Service Uniform jacket (when not worn in dress configuration) centered on the shoulder loops an equal distance from the outside shoulder seam to the outside edge of the button, with the base of the insignia toward the outside shoulder seam. 
Above the nameplate on the Class A and Class B service uniforms, when the DUI is worn in lieu of a regimental distinctive insignia (RDI). At the soldier's option the RDI, the DUI of their current assignment or the DUI of a previous assignment may be worn above the nameplate.  If worn, the RDI for whole branch regiments (MP, Signal, Quartermaster) must be that of the soldier's current career field.
 
When a DUI is authorized, all personnel assigned to the organization wear the insignia, except general officers, the Sergeant Major of the Army and the Senior Enlisted Advisor to the Chairman. General officers wear their regimental distinctive insignia (RDI) on the black pullover sweater.  The Sergeant Major of the Army and Senior Enlisted Advisor to the Chairman (if a soldier) wear, respectively, the SMA and SEAC collar insignia in lieu of the DUI on their pullover sweaters and berets, but their epaulets are bare.

Units not listed in AR 670-1 (other than USAG) may request a DUI be authorized if the unit has at least 500 military assigned (250 for Department of the Army operating agencies). The Army element of joint commands may be authorized a DUI if the Army element has at least 500 Army personnel.

Examples

Adjutant General

Alphabetical units

Air Defense Artillery

Army

Armor

Aviation

Cavalry

Chemical

Civil Affairs

Corps

Divisions

Engineer

Field Artillery

Infantry

Information Operations

Maneuver enhancement

Medical and veterinary

Military Intelligence

Military Police

Multi–Domain Task Forces

National Guard State Joint Headquarters' Army Elements

Ordnance

Psychological Operations

Quartermaster

Regional support groups

Security Force Assistance

Signal

Space and Missile Defense

Special Forces

Special troops battalions

Support

Transportation

See also
 Shoulder sleeve insignia – which describes the unit formation patches worn on the upper left and right sleeves below the shoulder hem.

 United States military beret flash
 Heraldic badge

References

Further reading
 The Institute of Heraldry, Heraldic Services Handbook, 1997
 Heralding Devices, Soldiers Magazine, January 1985

External links
 Official web site – The Institute of Heraldry
 U.S. Army Quartermaster Foundation – U. S. Army Heraldry

Military heraldry
United States Army
Heraldry of the United States Army
Heraldic badges
United States military unit insignia